Pope  John Paul II (born Karol Józef Wojtyła ; 18 May 19202 April 2005) was head of the Catholic Church and sovereign of the Vatican City State from 1978 until his death in 2005. He was later canonised as Pope Saint John Paul II.

Cardinal Wojtyła was elected pope on the third day of the second papal conclave of 1978, which was called after John Paul I, who had been elected in the first papal conclave of 1978 earlier in August to succeed Pope Paul VI, died after 33 days. Wojtyła adopted the name of his predecessor in tribute to him. Born in Poland, John Paul II was the first non-Italian pope since Adrian VI in the 16th century and the second longest-serving pope after Pius IX in modern history. John Paul II attempted to improve the Catholic Church's relations with Judaism, Islam, and the Eastern Orthodox Church. He maintained the church's previous positions on such matters as abortion, artificial contraception, the ordination of women, and a celibate clergy, and although he supported the reforms of the Second Vatican Council, he was seen as generally conservative in their interpretation. He was one of the most travelled world leaders in history, visiting 129 countries during his pontificate. As part of his special emphasis on the universal call to holiness, he beatified 1,344, and also canonised 483 people, more than the combined tally of his predecessors during the preceding five centuries. By the time of his death, he had named most of the College of Cardinals, consecrated or co-consecrated many of the world's bishops, and ordained many priests. He has been credited with helping to end Communist rule in his native Poland and the rest of Europe.

John Paul II's cause for canonisation commenced one month after his death with the traditional five-year waiting period waived. On 19 December 2009, John Paul II was proclaimed venerable by his successor, Benedict XVI, and was beatified on 1 May 2011 (Divine Mercy Sunday) after the Congregation for the Causes of Saints attributed one miracle to his intercession, the healing of a French nun called Marie Simon Pierre from Parkinson's disease. A second miracle was approved on 2 July 2013, and confirmed by Pope Francis two days later. John Paul II was canonised on 27 April 2014 (again Divine Mercy Sunday), together with John XXIII. On 11 September 2014, Pope Francis added these two feast days to the worldwide General Roman Calendar of saints. While saints' feast days are traditionally celebrated on the anniversary of their deaths, that of John Paul II (22 October) is celebrated on the anniversary of his papal inauguration. Posthumously, he has been referred to by some Catholics as "Pope St. John Paul the Great", although the title has no official recognition.

On 6 March 2023, an investigative report by the Polish television station TVN24 concluded that "there [is now] no doubt" that John Paul II "knew about sexual abuse of children by priests under his authority and sought to conceal it when he was an archbishop in his native Poland". The Dutch journalist Ekke Overbeek released a book on John Paul II with similar claims the following week. In response to the claims, Pope Francis stated: "You have to put things in the context of the era[...] At that time everything was covered up. [...] It was only when the Boston scandal broke that the church began to look at the problem". The Polish Episcopal Conference stated that "'further archival research' would be needed to arrive at a just evaluation of the decisions and actions" of Wojtyła.

Early life 

Karol Józef Wojtyła was born in the Polish town of Wadowice. He was the youngest of three children born to Karol Wojtyła (1879–1941), an ethnic Pole, and Emilia Kaczorowska (1884–1929), who was of distant Lithuanian heritage. Emilia, who was a schoolteacher, died from a heart attack and kidney failure in 1929 when Wojtyła was eight years old. His elder sister Olga had died before his birth, but he was close to his brother Edmund, nicknamed Mundek, who was 13 years his senior. Edmund's work as a physician eventually led to his death from scarlet fever, a loss that affected Wojtyła deeply.

Wojtyła was baptized a month after his birth, made his First Communion at the age of 9, and was confirmed at the age of 18. As a boy, Wojtyła was athletic, often playing association football as goalkeeper. During his childhood, Wojtyła had contact with the large Jewish community of Wadowice. School football games were often organised between teams of Jews and Catholics, and Wojtyła often played on the Jewish side. In 2005, he recalled: "I remember that at least a third of my classmates at elementary school in Wadowice were Jews. At secondary school there were fewer. With some I was on very friendly terms. And what struck me about some of them was their Polish patriotism." It was around this time that the young Karol had his first serious relationship with a girl. He became close to a girl called Ginka Beer, described as "a Jewish beauty, with stupendous eyes and jet black hair, slender, a superb actress."

In mid-1938, Wojtyła and his father left Wadowice and moved to Kraków, where he enrolled at the Jagiellonian University. While studying such topics as philology and various languages, he worked as a volunteer librarian and though required to participate in compulsory military training in the Academic Legion, he refused to fire a weapon. He performed with various theatrical groups and worked as a playwright. During this time, his talent for language blossomed, and he learned as many as 15 languages — Polish, Latin, Italian, English, Spanish, Portuguese, French, German, Luxembourgish, Dutch, Ukrainian, Serbo-Croatian, Czech, Slovak, and Esperanto, nine of which he used extensively as pope.

In 1939, after invading Poland, Nazi Germany's occupation forces closed the university. Able-bodied males were required to work, so from 1940 to 1944 Wojtyła variously worked as a messenger for a restaurant, a manual labourer in a limestone quarry and for the Solvay chemical factory, in order to avoid deportation to Germany. In February 1940, he met Jan Tyranowski who introduced him to the Carmelite spirituality and the "Living Rosary" youth groups. In that same year he had two major accidents, suffering a fractured skull after being struck by a tram and sustaining injuries which left him with one shoulder higher than the other and a permanent stoop after being hit by a lorry in a quarry. His father, a former Austro-Hungarian non-commissioned officer and later officer in the Polish Army, died of a heart attack in 1941, leaving Wojtyła as the immediate family's only surviving member. Reflecting on these times of his life, nearly forty years later he said: "I was not at my mother's death, I was not at my brother's death, I was not at my father's death. At twenty, I had already lost all the people I loved."

After his father's death, he started thinking seriously about the priesthood. In October 1942, while World War II continued, he knocked on the door of the Bishop's Palace, Kraków, and asked to study for the priesthood. Soon after, he began courses in the clandestine underground seminary run by the Archbishop of Kraków, Cardinal Adam Stefan Sapieha. On 29 February 1944, Wojtyła was hit by a German truck. German Wehrmacht officers tended to him and sent him to a hospital. He spent two weeks there recovering from a severe concussion and a shoulder injury. It seemed to him that this accident and his survival was a confirmation of his vocation. On 6 August 1944, a day known as "Black Sunday", the Gestapo rounded up young men in Kraków to curtail the uprising there,  similar to the recent uprising in Warsaw. Wojtyła escaped by hiding in the basement of his uncle's house at 10 Tyniecka Street, while the German troops searched above. More than eight thousand men and boys were taken that day, while Wojtyła escaped to the Archbishop's residence, where he remained until after the Germans had left.

On the night of 17 January 1945, the Germans fled the city, and the students reclaimed the ruined seminary. Wojtyła and another seminarian volunteered for the task of clearing away piles of frozen excrement from the toilets. Wojtyła also helped a 14-year-old Jewish refugee girl named Edith Zierer, who had escaped from a Nazi labour camp in Częstochowa. Edith had collapsed on a railway platform, so Wojtyła carried her to a train and stayed with her throughout the journey to Kraków. She later credited Wojtyła with saving her life that day. B'nai B'rith and other authorities have said that Wojtyła helped protect many other Polish Jews from the Nazis. During the Nazi occupation of Poland, a Jewish family sent their son, Stanley Berger, to be hidden by a Gentile Polish family. Berger's biological Jewish parents were killed in the Holocaust, and after the war Berger's new Christian parents asked Karol Wojtyła to baptise the boy. Wojtyła refused, saying that the child should be raised in the Jewish faith of his birth parents and nation, not as a Catholic. He did everything he could to ensure that Berger leave Poland to be raised by his Jewish relatives in the United States. In April 2005, shortly after John Paul II's death, the Israeli government created a commission to honour the legacy of John Paul II. One of the honorifics proposed by a head of Italy's Jewish community, Emmanuele Pacifici was the medal of the Righteous Among the Nations. In Wojtyła's last book, Memory and Identity, he described the 12 years of the Nazi régime as "bestiality", quoting from the Polish theologian and philosopher Konstanty Michalski.

Priesthood 

After finishing his studies at the seminary in Kraków, Wojtyła was ordained as a priest on All Saints' Day, 1 November 1946, by the archbishop of Kraków, cardinal Adam Stefan Sapieha. Sapieha sent Wojtyła to Rome's Pontifical International Athenaeum Angelicum, the future Pontifical University of Saint Thomas Aquinas, to study under the French Dominican friar Reginald Garrigou-Lagrange beginning on 26 November 1946. He resided in the Belgian Pontifical College during this time, under rectorship of Maximilien de Furstenberg. Wojtyła earned a licence in July 1947, passed his doctoral exam on 14 June 1948, and successfully defended his doctoral thesis titled Doctrina de fide apud S. Ioannem a Cruce (The Doctrine of Faith in St. John of the Cross) in philosophy on 19 June 1948. The Angelicum preserves the original copy of Wojtyła's typewritten thesis. Among other courses at the Angelicum, Wojtyła studied Hebrew with the Dutch Dominican Peter G. Duncker, author of the Compendium grammaticae linguae hebraicae biblicae.

According to Wojtyła's fellow student, the future Austrian cardinal Alfons Stickler, in 1947 during his sojourn at the Angelicum, Wojtyła visited Padre Pio, who heard his confession and told him that one day he would ascend to "the highest post in the Church". Stickler added that Wojtyła believed that the prophecy was fulfilled when he became a cardinal.

Wojtyła returned to Poland in the summer of 1948 for his first pastoral assignment in the village of Niegowić,  from Kraków, at the Church of the Assumption. He arrived at Niegowić at harvest time, where his first action was to kneel and kiss the ground. He repeated this gesture, which he adopted from Jean Marie Baptiste Vianney, throughout his papacy.

In March 1949, Wojtyła was transferred to the parish of Saint Florian in Kraków. He taught ethics at Jagiellonian University and subsequently at the Catholic University of Lublin. While teaching, he gathered a group of about 20 young people, who began to call themselves Rodzinka, the "little family". They met for prayer, philosophical discussion, and to help the blind and the sick. The group eventually grew to approximately 200 participants, and their activities expanded to include annual skiing and kayaking trips.

In 1953, Wojtyła's habilitation thesis was accepted by the Faculty of Theology at the Jagiellonian University. In 1954, he earned a Doctorate in Sacred Theology, writing a dissertation titled "Reevaluation of the possibility of founding a Catholic ethic on the ethical system of Max Scheler". Scheler was a German philosopher who founded a broad philosophical movement that emphasised the study of conscious experience. The Polish Communist authorities abolished the Faculty of Theology at the Jagiellonian University, thereby preventing him from receiving the degree until 1957. Wojtyła developed a theological approach, called phenomenological Thomism, that combined traditional Catholic Thomism with the ideas of personalism, a philosophical approach deriving from phenomenology, which was popular among Catholic intellectuals in Kraków during Wojtyła's intellectual development. He translated Scheler's Formalism and the Ethics of Substantive Values. In 1961, he coined "Thomistic Personalism" to describe Aquinas's philosophy.

During this period, Wojtyła wrote a series of articles in Kraków's Catholic newspaper, Tygodnik Powszechny (Universal Weekly), dealing with contemporary church issues. He focused on creating original literary work during his first dozen years as a priest. War, life in the Polish People's Republic, and his pastoral responsibilities all fed his poetry and plays. Wojtyła published his work under two pseudonyms, Andrzej Jawień and Stanisław Andrzej Gruda, to distinguish his literary from his religious writings (issued under his own name), and also so that his literary works would be considered on their own merits. In 1960, Wojtyła published the influential theological book Love and Responsibility, a defence of traditional church teachings on marriage from a new philosophical standpoint.

The aforementioned students regularly joined Wojtyła for hiking, skiing, bicycling, camping and kayaking, accompanied by prayer, outdoor Masses and theological discussions. In Stalinist-era Poland, it was not permitted for priests to travel with groups of students. Wojtyła asked his younger companions to call him "Wujek" (Polish for "Uncle") to prevent outsiders from deducing he was a priest. The nickname gained popularity among his followers. In 1958, when Wojtyła was named auxiliary bishop of Kraków, his acquaintances expressed concern that this would cause him to change. Wojtyła responded to his friends, "Wujek will remain Wujek," and he continued to live a simple life, shunning the trappings that came with his position as bishop. This beloved nickname stayed with Wojtyła for his entire life and continues to be affectionately used, particularly by the Polish people.

Episcopate and cardinalate

Call to the episcopate 

On 4 July 1958, while Wojtyła was on a kayaking holiday in the lakes region of northern Poland, Pope Pius XII appointed him as an auxiliary bishop of Kraków. He was consequently summoned to Warsaw to meet the Primate of Poland, Cardinal Stefan Wyszyński, who informed him of his appointment. Wojtyła accepted the appointment as auxiliary bishop to Kraków's Archbishop Eugeniusz Baziak, and he received episcopal consecration (as titular bishop of Ombi) on 28 September 1958, with Baziak as the principal consecrator and as co-consecrators Bishop Bolesław Kominek (titular bishop of Sophene), auxiliary of the Catholic Archdiocese of Wrocław, and Franciszek Jop, Auxiliary Bishop of Sandomierz (Titular Bishop of Daulia). Kominek was to become Cardinal Archbishop of Wrocław) and Jop was later Auxiliary Bishop of Wrocław and then Bishop of Opole). At the age of 38, Wojtyła became the youngest bishop in Poland.

In 1959, Wojtyła began an annual tradition of saying a Midnight Mass on Christmas Day in an open field at Nowa Huta, the so-called model workers' town outside Kraków that was without a church building. Baziak died in June 1962 and on 16 July, Wojtyła was selected as Vicar Capitular (temporary administrator) of the Archdiocese until an archbishop could be appointed.

Participation in Vatican II and subsequent events 
From October 1962, Wojtyła took part in the Second Vatican Council (1962–1965), where he made contributions to two of its most historic and influential products, the Decree on Religious Freedom (in Latin, Dignitatis humanae) and the Pastoral Constitution on the Church in the Modern World (Gaudium et spes). Wojtyła and the Polish bishops contributed a draft text to the Council for Gaudium et spes. According to the Jesuit historian John W. O'Malley, the draft text Gaudium et spes that Wojtyła and the Polish delegation sent "had some influence on the version that was sent to the council fathers that summer but was not accepted as the base text". According to John F. Crosby, as pope, John Paul II used the words of Gaudium et spes later to introduce his own views on the nature of the human person in relation to God: man is "the only creature on earth that God has wanted for its own sake", but man "can fully discover his true self only in a sincere giving of himself".

He also participated in the assemblies of the Synod of Bishops. On 13 January 1964, Pope Paul VI appointed him Archbishop of Kraków. On 26 June 1967, Paul VI announced Wojtyła's promotion to the College of Cardinals. Wojtyła was named cardinal priest of the titulus of San Cesareo in Palatio.

In 1967, he was instrumental in formulating the encyclical Humanae vitae, which dealt with the same issues that forbid abortion and artificial birth control.

According to a contemporary witness, Wojtyła was against the distribution of a letter around Kraków in 1970, stating that the Polish Episcopate was preparing for the 50th anniversary of the Polish–Soviet War.

In 1973, Wojtyła met philosopher Anna-Teresa Tymieniecka, the wife of Hendrik S. Houthakker, professor of economics at Stanford University and Harvard University, and member of President Nixon's Council of Economic Advisers Tymieniecka collaborated with Wojtyła on a number of projects including an English translation of Wojtyła's book Osoba i czyn (Person and Act). Person and Act, one of John Paul II's foremost literary works, was initially written in Polish. Tymieniecka produced the English-language version. They corresponded over the years, and grew to be good friends. When Wojtyła visited New England in the summer of 1976, Tymieniecka put him up as a guest in her family home. Wojtyła enjoyed his holiday in Pomfret, Vermont, kayaking and enjoying the outdoors, as he had done in his beloved Poland.

During 1974–1975, Wojtyła served Pope Paul VI as consultor to the Pontifical Council for the Laity, as recording secretary for the 1974 synod on evangelism and by participating extensively in the original drafting of the 1975 apostolic exhortation, Evangelii nuntiandi.

Papacy

Election 

In August 1978, following the death of Pope Paul VI, Wojtyła voted in the papal conclave, which elected John Paul I. John Paul I died after only 33 days as pope, triggering another conclave.

The second conclave of 1978 started on 14 October, ten days after the funeral. It was split between two strong candidates for the papacy: Cardinal Giuseppe Siri, the conservative Archbishop of Genoa, and the liberal Archbishop of Florence, Cardinal Giovanni Benelli, a close friend of John Paul I.

Supporters of Benelli were confident that he would be elected, and in early ballots, Benelli came within nine votes of success. However, both men faced sufficient opposition for neither to be likely to prevail. Giovanni Colombo, the Archbishop of Milan, was considered as a compromise candidate among the Italian cardinal-electors, but when he started to receive votes, he announced that, if elected, he would decline to accept the papacy. Cardinal Franz König, Archbishop of Vienna, suggested Wojtyła as another compromise candidate to his fellow electors. Wojtyła won on the eighth ballot on the third day (16 October).

Among those cardinals who rallied behind Wojtyła were supporters of Giuseppe Siri, Stefan Wyszyński, most of the American cardinals (led by John Krol), and other moderate cardinals. He accepted his election with the words: "With obedience in faith to Christ, my Lord, and with trust in the Mother of Christ and the Church, in spite of great difficulties, I accept". The pope, in tribute to his immediate predecessor, then took the regnal name of John Paul II, also in honor of the late Pope Paul VI, and the traditional white smoke informed the crowd gathered in St. Peter's Square that a pope had been chosen. There had been rumors that the new pope wished to be known as Pope Stanislaus in honor of the Polish saint of the name, but was convinced by the cardinals that it was not a Roman name. When the new pontiff appeared on the balcony, he broke tradition by addressing the gathered crowd:

"Dear brothers and sisters, we are saddened at the death of our beloved Pope John Paul I, and so the cardinals have called for a new bishop of Rome. They called him from a faraway land—far and yet always close because of our communion in faith and Christian traditions. I was afraid to accept that responsibility, yet I do so in a spirit of obedience to the Lord and total faithfulness to Mary, our most Holy Mother. I am speaking to you in your—no, our Italian language. If I make a mistake, please  me [deliberately mispronouncing the word 'correct'] ... ."

Wojtyła became the 264th pope according to the chronological list of popes, the first non-Italian in 455 years. At only 58 years of age, he was the youngest pope since Pope Pius IX in 1846, who was 54. Like his predecessor, John Paul II dispensed with the traditional papal coronation and instead received ecclesiastical investiture with a simplified papal inauguration on 22 October 1978. During his inauguration, when the cardinals were to kneel before him to take their vows and kiss his ring, he stood up as the Polish prelate, Cardinal Stefan Wyszyński knelt down, stopped him from kissing the ring, and simply embraced him.

Pastoral journeys 

During his pontificate, John Paul II made journeys to 129 countries, travelling more than  while doing so. He consistently attracted large crowds, some among the largest ever assembled in human history, such as the Manila World Youth Day, which gathered up to four million people, the largest papal gathering ever, according to the Vatican. John Paul II's earliest official visits were to the Dominican Republic and Mexico in January 1979. While some of his journeys (such as to the United States and the Holy Land) were to places previously visited by Pope Paul VI, John Paul II became the first pope to visit the White House in October 1979, where he was greeted warmly by President Jimmy Carter. He was the first pope ever to visit several countries in one year, starting in 1979 with Mexico and Ireland. He was the first reigning pope to travel to the United Kingdom, in 1982, where he met Queen Elizabeth II, the Supreme Governor of the Church of England. While in Britain he also visited Canterbury Cathedral and knelt in prayer with Robert Runcie, the Archbishop of Canterbury, at the spot where Thomas Becket had been killed, as well as holding several large-scale open air masses, including one at Wembley Stadium, which was attended by some 80,000 people.

He travelled to Haiti in 1983, where he spoke in Creole to thousands of impoverished Catholics gathered to greet him at the airport. His message, "things must change in Haiti," referring to the disparity between the wealthy and the poor, was met with thunderous applause. In 2000, he was the first modern pope to visit Egypt, where he met with the Coptic pope, Pope Shenouda III and the Greek Orthodox Patriarch of Alexandria. He was the first Catholic pope to visit and pray in an Islamic mosque, in Damascus, Syria, in 2001. He visited the Umayyad Mosque, a former Christian church where John the Baptist is believed to be interred, where he made a speech calling for Muslims, Christians and Jews to live together.

On 15 January 1995, during the X World Youth Day, he offered Mass to an estimated crowd of between five and seven million in Luneta Park, Manila, Philippines, which was considered to be the largest single gathering in Christian history. In March 2000, while visiting Jerusalem, John Paul became the first pope in history to visit and pray at the Western Wall. In September 2001, amid post-11 September concerns, he travelled to Kazakhstan, with an audience largely consisting of Muslims, and to Armenia, to participate in the celebration of 1,700 years of Armenian Christianity.

In June 1979, John Paul II travelled to Poland, where ecstatic crowds constantly surrounded him. This first papal trip to Poland uplifted the nation's spirit and sparked the formation of the Solidarity movement in 1980, which later brought freedom and human rights to his troubled homeland. Leaders of the Polish United Workers' Party intended to use the pope's visit to show the people that although the pope was Polish, it did not alter their capacity to govern, oppress, and distribute the goods of society. They also hoped that if the pope abided by the rules they set, the Polish people would see his example and follow them as well. If the pope's visit inspired a riot, the Communist leaders of Poland were prepared to crush the uprising and blame the suffering on the pope.

"When Pope John Paul II kissed the ground at the Warsaw airport he began the process by which Communism in Poland — and ultimately elsewhere in Europe — would come to an end."

On later trips to Poland, he gave tacit support to the Solidarity organisation. These visits reinforced this message and contributed to the collapse of East European Communism that took place between 1989 and 1990 with the reintroduction of democracy in Poland, and which then spread through Eastern Europe (1990–1991) and South-Eastern Europe (1990–1992).

World Youth Days

As an extension of his successful work with youth as a young priest, John Paul II pioneered the international World Youth Days. John Paul II presided over nine of them: Rome (1985 and 2000), Buenos Aires (1987), Santiago de Compostela (1989), Częstochowa (1991), Denver (1993), Manila (1995), Paris (1997), and Toronto (2002). Total attendance at these signature events of the pontificate was in the tens of millions.

Dedicated Years

Keenly aware of the rhythms of time and the importance of anniversaries in the Catholic Church's life, John Paul II led nine "dedicated years" during the twenty-six and a half years of his pontificate: the Holy Year of the Redemption in 1983–84, the Marian Year in 1987–88, the Year of the Family in 1993–94, the three Trinitarian years of preparation for the Great Jubilee of 2000, the Great Jubilee itself, the Year of the Rosary in 2002–3, and the Year of the Eucharist, which began on 17 October 2004, and concluded six months after the Pope's death.

Great Jubilee of 2000
The Great Jubilee of 2000 was a call to the church to become more aware and to embrace her missionary task for the work of evangelization.

"From the beginning of my Pontificate, my thoughts had been on this Holy Year 2000 as an important appointment. I thought of its celebration as a providential opportunity during which the Church, thirty-five years after the Second Vatican Ecumenical Council, would examine how far she had renewed herself, in order to be able to take up her evangelising mission with fresh enthusiasm."

John Paul II also made a pilgrimage to the Holy Land for the Great Jubilee of 2000. During his visit to the Holy Land, John Paul II visited many sites of the Rosary, including the following locations: Bethany Beyond the Jordan (Al-Maghtas), at the Jordan River, where John the Baptist baptized Jesus; Manger Square and the Church of the Nativity in the town of Bethlehem, the location of Jesus' birth; and the Church of the Holy Sepulchre in Jerusalem, the site of Jesus' burial and resurrection.

Teachings 

As pope, John Paul II wrote 14 papal encyclicals and taught about sexuality in what is referred as the "Theology of the Body". Some key elements of his strategy to "reposition the Catholic Church" were encyclicals such as Ecclesia de Eucharistia, Reconciliatio et paenitentia and Redemptoris Mater. In his At the beginning of the new millennium (Novo Millennio Ineunte), he emphasised the importance of "starting afresh from Christ": "No, we shall not be saved by a formula but by a Person." In The Splendour of the Truth (Veritatis Splendor), he emphasised the dependence of man on God and His Law ("Without the Creator, the creature disappears") and the "dependence of freedom on the truth". He warned that man "giving himself over to relativism and scepticism, goes off in search of an illusory freedom apart from truth itself". In Fides et Ratio (On the Relationship between Faith and Reason) John Paul promoted a renewed interest in philosophy and an autonomous pursuit of truth in theological matters. Drawing on many different sources (such as Thomism), he described the mutually supporting relationship between faith and reason, and emphasised that theologians should focus on that relationship. John Paul II wrote extensively about workers and the social doctrine of the church, which he discussed in three encyclicals: Laborem exercens, Sollicitudo rei socialis, and Centesimus annus. Through his encyclicals and many Apostolic Letters and Exhortations, John Paul II talked about the dignity and the equality of women. He argued for the importance of the family for the future of humanity.

Other encyclicals include The Gospel of Life (Evangelium Vitae) and Ut Unum Sint (That They May Be One). Though critics accused him of inflexibility in explicitly re-asserting Catholic moral teachings against abortion and euthanasia that have been in place for well over a thousand years, he urged a more nuanced view of capital punishment. In his second encyclical Dives in misericordia he stressed that divine mercy is the greatest feature of God, needed especially in modern times.

Social and political stances 

John Paul II was considered a conservative on doctrine and issues relating to human sexual reproduction and the ordination of women. While he was visiting the United States in 1977, the year before becoming pope, Wojtyła said: "All human life, from the moments of conception and through all subsequent stages, is sacred."

A series of 129 lectures given by John Paul II during his Wednesday audiences in Rome between September 1979 and November 1984 were later compiled and published as a single work titled Theology of the Body, an extended meditation on human sexuality. He extended it to the condemnation of abortion, euthanasia, and virtually all capital punishment, calling them all a part of a struggle between a "culture of life" and a "culture of death". He campaigned for world debt forgiveness and social justice. He coined the term "social mortgage", which related that all private property had a social dimension, namely that "the goods of this are originally meant for all." In 2000, he publicly endorsed the Jubilee 2000 campaign on African debt relief fronted by Irish rock stars Bob Geldof and Bono, once famously interrupting a U2 recording session by telephoning the studio and asking to speak to Bono.

John Paul II, who was present and very influential at the 1962–65 Second Vatican Council, affirmed the teachings of that Council and did much to implement them. Nevertheless, his critics often wished that he would embrace what has been called a progressive agenda that some hoped would evolve as a result of the Council. In fact, the Council did not advocate progressive changes in these areas; for example, they still condemned abortion as an unspeakable crime. John Paul II continued to declare that contraception, abortion, and homosexual acts were gravely sinful, and, along with Joseph Ratzinger (future Pope Benedict XVI), opposed liberation theology.

Following the church's exaltation of the marital act of sexual intercourse between a baptised man and woman within sacramental marriage as proper and exclusive to the sacrament of marriage, John Paul II believed that it was, in every instance, profaned by contraception, abortion, divorce followed by a 'second' marriage, and by homosexual acts. In 1994, John Paul II asserted the church's lack of authority to ordain women to the priesthood, stating that without such authority ordination is not legitimately compatible with fidelity to Christ. This was also deemed a repudiation of calls to break with the constant tradition of the church by ordaining women to the priesthood. In addition, John Paul II chose not to end the discipline of mandatory priestly celibacy, although in a small number of unusual circumstances, he did allow certain married clergymen of other Christian traditions who later became Catholic to be ordained as Catholic priests.

Apartheid in South Africa 
John Paul II was an outspoken opponent of apartheid in South Africa. In 1985, while visiting the Netherlands, he gave an impassioned speech condemning apartheid at the International Court of Justice, proclaiming that "No system of apartheid or separate development will ever be acceptable as a model for the relations between peoples or races." In September 1988, John Paul II made a pilgrimage to ten Southern African countries, including those bordering South Africa, while demonstratively avoiding South Africa. During his visit to Zimbabwe, John Paul II called for economic sanctions against South Africa's government. After John Paul II's death, both Nelson Mandela and Archbishop Desmond Tutu praised the pope for defending human rights and condemning economic injustice.

Capital punishment 
John Paul II was an outspoken opponent of the death penalty, although previous popes had accepted the practice. At a papal mass in St. Louis, Missouri, in the United States he said:

"A sign of hope is the increasing recognition that the dignity of human life must never be taken away, even in the case of someone who has done great evil. Modern society has the means of protecting itself, without definitively denying criminals the chance to reform. I renew the appeal I made most recently at Christmas for a consensus to end the death penalty, which is both cruel and unnecessary."

During that visit, John Paul II convinced the then governor of Missouri, Mel Carnahan, to reduce the death sentence of convicted murderer Darrell J. Mease to life imprisonment without parole. John Paul II's other attempts to reduce the sentence of death-row inmates were unsuccessful. In 1983, John Paul II visited Guatemala and unsuccessfully asked the country's president, Efraín Ríos Montt, to reduce the sentence for six left-wing guerrillas sentenced to death.

In 2002, John Paul II again travelled to Guatemala. At that time, Guatemala was one of only two countries in Latin America (the other being Cuba) to apply capital punishment. John Paul II asked the Guatemalan president, Alfonso Portillo, for a moratorium on executions.

European Union 
John Paul II pushed for a reference to Europe's Christian cultural roots in the draft of the European Constitution. In his 2003 apostolic exhortation Ecclesia in Europa, John Paul II wrote that he "fully (respected) the secular nature of (European) institutions". However, he wanted the constitution to enshrine religious rights, including acknowledging the rights of religious groups to organise freely, recognise the specific identity of each denomination and allow for a "structured dialogue" between each religious community and the European Union (EU), and extend across the EU the legal status enjoyed by religious institutions in individual member states. John Paul II said: "I wish once more to appeal to those drawing up the future European Constitutional Treaty so that it will include a reference to the religion and in particular to the Christian heritage of Europe." The pope's desire for a reference to Europe's Christian identity in the EU Constitution was supported by non-Catholic representatives of the Church of England and Eastern Orthodox Churches from Russia, Romania, and Greece. John Paul II's demand to include a reference to Europe's Christian roots in the European Constitution was supported by some non-Christians, such as Joseph Weiler, a practising Orthodox Jew and renowned constitutional lawyer, who said that the EU Constitution's lack of a reference to Christianity was not a "demonstration of neutrality" but rather "a Jacobin attitude".

At the same time, John Paul II was an enthusiastic supporter of European integration; in particular, he supported his native Poland's entry into the bloc. On 19 May 2003, three weeks before a referendum was held in Poland on EU membership, the Polish pope addressed his compatriots and urged them to vote for Poland's EU membership at St. Peter's Square in Vatican City State. While some conservative, Catholic politicians in Poland opposed EU membership, John Paul II said:

"I know that there are many in opposition to integration. I appreciate their concern about maintaining the cultural and religious identity of our nation. However, I must emphasise that Poland has always been an important part of Europe. Europe needs Poland. The Church in Europe needs the Poles' testimony of faith. Poland needs Europe."

The Polish pope compared Poland's entry into the EU to the Union of Lublin, which was signed in 1569 and united the Kingdom of Poland and the Grand Duchy of Lithuania into one nation and created an elective monarchy.

Evolution 
On 22 October 1996, in a speech to the Pontifical Academy of Sciences plenary session at the Vatican, John Paul II said of evolution that "this theory has been progressively accepted by researchers, following a series of discoveries in various fields of knowledge. The convergence, neither sought nor fabricated, of the results of work that was conducted independently is in itself a significant argument in favour of this theory." John Paul II's embrace of evolution was enthusiastically praised by American paleontologist and evolutionary biologist Stephen Jay Gould, with whom he had an audience in 1984.

Although generally accepting the theory of evolution, John Paul II made one major exception—the human soul, saying: "If the human body has its origin in living material which pre-exists it, the spiritual soul is immediately created by God."

Iraq War 
In 2003 John Paul II criticised the 2003 United States-led invasion of Iraq, saying in his State of the World address "No to war! War is not always inevitable. It is always a defeat for humanity." He sent Pio Cardinal Laghi, the former Apostolic Pro-Nuncio to the United States, to talk with George W. Bush, the US president, to express opposition to the war. John Paul II said that it was up to the United Nations to solve the international conflict through diplomacy and that a unilateral aggression is a crime against peace and a violation of international law. The pope's opposition to the Iraq War led to him being a candidate to win the 2003 Nobel Peace Prize, which was ultimately awarded to Iranian attorney/judge and noted human rights advocate Shirin Ebadi.

Liberation theology 
In 1984 and 1986, through Cardinal Ratzinger (future Pope Benedict XVI) as Prefect of the Congregation for the Doctrine of the Faith, John Paul II officially condemned aspects of Liberation theology, which had many followers in Latin America.

Visiting Europe, Salvadoran Archbishop Óscar Romero unsuccessfully advocated for the Vatican to condemn the right-wing military regime of El Salvador, for violations of human rights during the Salvadoran Civil War and the support of death squads. Though Romero expressed his frustration at working with clergy who cooperated with the government, John Paul II encouraged him to maintain episcopal unity as a top priority.

In his travel to Managua, Nicaragua in 1983, John Paul II harshly condemned what he dubbed the "popular Church", referencing the ecclesial base communities supported by the CELAM, and the Nicaraguan clergy's tendencies to support the leftist Sandinistas, reminding the clergy of their duties of obedience to the Holy See. During that visit Ernesto Cardenal, a priest and minister in the Sandinista government, knelt to kiss his hand. John Paul withdrew it, wagged his finger in Cardenal's face, and told him, "You must straighten out your position with the church."

Organised crime 
John Paul II was the first pontiff to denounce Mafia violence in Southern Italy. In 1993, during a pilgrimage to Agrigento, Sicily, he appealed to the Mafiosi: "I say to those responsible: 'Convert! One day, the judgment of God will arrive!'" In 1994, John Paul II visited Catania and told victims of Mafia violence to "rise up and cloak yourself in light and justice!"

In 1995, the Mafia bombed two historical churches in Rome. Some believed that this was the mob's vendetta against the pope for his denunciations of organised crime.

Persian Gulf War 
Between 1990 and 1991, a 34-nation coalition led by the United States waged a war against Saddam Hussein's Iraq, which had invaded and annexed Kuwait. John Paul II was a staunch opponent of the Gulf War. Throughout the conflict, he appealed to the international community to stop the war, and after it was over led diplomatic initiatives to negotiate peace in the Middle East. In his 1991 encyclical Centesimus Annus, John Paul II harshly condemned the conflict:

"No, never again war, which destroys the lives of innocent people, teaches how to kill, throws into upheaval even the lives of those who do the killing and leaves behind a trail of resentment and hatred, thus making it all the more difficult to find a just solution of the very problems which provoked the war."

In April 1991, during his Urbi et Orbi Sunday message at St. Peter's Basilica, John Paul II called for the international community to "lend an ear" to "the long-ignored aspirations of oppressed peoples". He specifically named the Kurds, a people who were fighting a civil war against Saddam Hussein's troops in Iraq, as one such people, and referred to the war as a "darkness menacing the earth". During this time, the Vatican had expressed its frustration with the international ignoring of the pope's calls for peace in the Middle East.

Rwandan genocide 

In 1990, during the civil war between Tutsis and Hutus in the mostly Catholic country of Rwanda, John Paul II called for a ceasefire and condemned the persecution of the Tutsis. In 1994, he was the first world leader to condemn the massacre of the Tutsis as a genocide. In 1995, during his third visit to Kenya before an audience of 300,000, John Paul II pleaded for an end to the violence in Rwanda and Burundi, urging forgiveness and reconciliation as a solution to the genocide. He told Rwandan and Burundian refugees that he "was close to them and shared their immense pain". He said:

"What is happening in your countries is a terrible tragedy that must end. During the African Synod, we, the pastors of the church, felt the duty to express our consternation and to launch an appeal for forgiveness and reconciliation. This is the only way to dissipate the threats of ethnocentrism that are hovering over Africa these days and that have so brutally touched Rwanda and Burundi."

Views on sexuality 

While taking a traditional position on human sexuality, maintaining the Catholic Church's moral opposition to homosexual acts, John Paul II asserted that people with homosexual inclinations possess the same inherent dignity and rights as others. In his book Memory and Identity, he referred to the "strong pressures" by the European Parliament to recognise homosexual unions as an alternative type of family, with the right to adopt children. In the book, as quoted by Reuters, he wrote: "It is legitimate and necessary to ask oneself if this is not perhaps part of a new ideology of evil, more subtle and hidden, perhaps, intent upon exploiting human rights themselves against man and against the family."

In 1986, the Pope approved the release of a document from the Congregation for the Doctrine of the Faith regarding Letter to the Bishops of the Catholic Church on the Pastoral Care of Homosexual Persons. While not neglecting to comment on homosexuality and moral order, the letter issued multiple affirmations of the dignity of homosexual persons.

A 1997 study determined that of all the pope's public statements, only 3% addressed the issue of sexual morality.

Reform of canon law 

John Paul II completed a full-scale reform of the Catholic Church's legal system, Latin and Eastern, and a reform of the Roman Curia.

On 18 October 1990, when promulgating the Code of Canons of the Eastern Churches, John Paul II stated

In 1998, John Paul II issued the motu proprio Ad tuendam fidem, which amended two canons (750 and 1371) of the 1983 Code of Canon Law and two canons (598 and 1436) of the 1990 Code of Canons of the Eastern Churches.

1983 Code of Canon Law 

On 25 January 1983, with the Apostolic Constitution Sacrae disciplinae leges John Paul II promulgated the current code of canon law for all members of the Catholic Church who belonged to the Latin Church. It entered into force the first Sunday of the following Advent, which was 27 November 1983. John Paul II described the new code as "the last document of Vatican II". Edward N. Peters has referred to the 1983 Code as the "Johanno-Pauline Code" (Johannes Paulus is Latin for "John Paul"), paralleling the "Pio-Benedictine" 1917 code that it replaced.

Code of Canons of the Eastern Churches 

John Paul II promulgated the Code of Canons of the Eastern Churches (CCEO) on 18 October 1990, by the document Sacri Canones. The CCEO came into force of law on 1 October 1991. It is the codification of the common portions of the canon law for the 23 of the 24 sui iuris churches in the Catholic Church that are the Eastern Catholic Churches. It is divided into 30 titles and has a total of 1540 canons.

Pastor bonus 

John Paul II promulgated the apostolic constitution Pastor bonus on 28 June 1988. It instituted a number of reforms in the process of running the Roman Curia. Pastor bonus laid out in considerable detail the organisation of the Roman Curia, specifying precisely the names and composition of each dicastery, and enumerating the competencies of each dicastery. It replaced the previous special law, Regimini Ecclesiæ universæ, which was promulgated by Paul VI in 1967.

Catechism of the Catholic Church 

On 11 October 1992, in his apostolic constitution Fidei depositum (The Deposit of Faith), John Paul ordered the publication of the Catechism of the Catholic Church.

He declared the publication to be "a sure norm for teaching the faith … a sure and authentic reference text for teaching Catholic doctrine and particularly for preparing local catechisms". It was "meant to encourage and assist in the writing of new local catechisms [both applicable and faithful]" rather than replacing them.

Relationship with dictatorships 
According to Joaquín Navarro-Valls, John Paul II's press secretary:

"The single fact of John Paul II's election in 1978 changed everything. In Poland, everything began. Not in East Germany or Czechoslovakia. Then the whole thing spread. Why in 1980 did they lead the way in Gdansk? Why did they decide, now or never? Only because there was a Polish pope. He was in Chile and Pinochet was out. He was in Haiti and Duvalier was out. He was in the Philippines and Marcos was out. On many of those occasions, people would come here to the Vatican thanking the Holy Father for changing things."

Chile 
Before John Paul II's pilgrimage to Latin America, during a meeting with reporters, he criticised Augusto Pinochet's regime as "dictatorial". In the words of The New York Times, he used "unusually strong language" to criticise Pinochet and asserted to journalists that the church in Chile must not only pray, but actively fight for the restoration of democracy in Chile.

During his visit to Chile in 1987, John Paul II asked Chile's 31 Catholic bishops to campaign for free elections in the country. According to George Weigel and Cardinal Stanisław Dziwisz, he encouraged Pinochet to accept a democratic opening of the regime, and may even have called for his resignation. According to Monsignor Sławomir Oder, the postulator of John Paul II's beatification cause, John Paul's words to Pinochet had a profound impact on the Chilean dictator. The pope confided to a friend: "I received a letter from Pinochet in which he told me that as a Catholic he had listened to my words, he had accepted them, and he had decided to begin the process to change the leadership of his country."

During his visit to Chile, John Paul II supported the Vicariate of Solidarity, the church-led pro-democracy, anti-Pinochet organisation. John Paul II visited the Vicariate of Solidarity's offices, spoke with its workers, and "called upon them to continue their work, emphasizing that the Gospel consistently urges respect for human rights". While in Chile, John Paul II made gestures of public support of Chile's anti-Pinochet democratic opposition. For instance, he hugged and kissed Carmen Gloria Quintana, a young student who had been nearly burned to death by Chilean police and told her that "We must pray for peace and justice in Chile." Later, he met with several opposition groups, including those that had been declared illegal by Pinochet's government. The opposition praised John Paul II for denouncing Pinochet as a dictator, for many members of Chile's opposition were persecuted for much milder statements. Bishop Carlos Camus, one of the harshest critics of Pinochet's dictatorship within the Chilean Church, praised John Paul II's stance during the papal visit, saying: "I am quite moved, because our pastor supports us totally. Never again will anyone be able to say that we are interfering in politics when we defend human dignity." He added: "No country the Pope has visited has remained the same after his departure. The Pope's visit is a mission, an extraordinary social catechism, and his stay here will be a watershed in Chilean history."

Some have erroneously accused John Paul II of affirming Pinochet's regime by appearing with the Chilean ruler in public. Cardinal Roberto Tucci, the organiser of John Paul II's visits, revealed that Pinochet tricked the pontiff by telling him he would take him to his living room, while in reality he took him to his balcony. Tucci says that the pontiff was "furious".

Haiti 
John Paul II visited Haiti on 9 March 1983, when the country was ruled by Jean-Claude "Baby Doc" Duvalier. He bluntly criticised the poverty of the country, directly addressing Baby Doc and his wife, Michèle Bennett in front of a large crowd of Haitians:

"Yours is a beautiful country, rich in human resources, but Christians cannot be unaware of the injustice, the excessive inequality, the degradation of the quality of life, the misery, the hunger, the fear suffered by the majority of the people."

John Paul II spoke in French and occasionally in Creole, and in the homily outlined the basic human rights that most Haitians lacked: "the opportunity to eat enough, to be cared for when ill, to find housing, to study, to overcome illiteracy, to find worthwhile and properly paid work; all that provides a truly human life for men and women, for young and old." Following John Paul II's pilgrimage, the Haitian opposition to Duvalier frequently reproduced and quoted the pope's message. Shortly before leaving Haiti, John Paul II called for social change in Haiti by saying: "Lift up your heads, be conscious of your dignity of men created in God's image...."

John Paul II's visit inspired massive protests against the Duvalier dictatorship. In response to the visit, 860 Catholic priests and church workers signed a statement committing the church to work on behalf of the poor. In 1986, Duvalier was deposed in an uprising.

Paraguay 
The collapse of the dictatorship of General Alfredo Stroessner of Paraguay was linked, among other things, to John Paul II's visit to the South American country in May 1988. Since Stroessner's taking power through a coup d'état in 1954, Paraguay's bishops increasingly criticised the regime for human rights abuses, rigged elections, and the country's feudal economy. During his private meeting with Stroessner, John Paul II told the dictator:

"Politics has a fundamental ethical dimension because it is first and foremost a service to man. The Church can and must remind men—and in particular those who govern—of their ethical duties for the good of the whole of society. The Church cannot be isolated inside its temples just as men's consciences cannot be isolated from God."

Later, during a Mass, John Paul II criticised the regime for impoverishing the peasants and the unemployed, saying that the government must give people greater access to the land. Although Stroessner tried to prevent him from doing so, John Paul II met opposition leaders in the one-party state.

Role in the fall of Communism

Role as spiritual inspiration and catalyst
By the late 1970s, the dissolution of the Soviet Union had been predicted by some observers. John Paul II has been credited with being instrumental in bringing down Communism in Central and Eastern Europe, by being the spiritual inspiration behind its downfall and catalyst for "a peaceful revolution" in Poland. Lech Wałęsa, the founder of Solidarity and the first post-Communist President of Poland, credited John Paul II with giving Poles the courage to demand change. According to Wałęsa, "Before his pontificate, the world was divided into blocs. Nobody knew how to get rid of Communism. In Warsaw, in 1979, he simply said: 'Do not be afraid', and later prayed: 'Let your Spirit descend and change the image of the land ... this land'." It has also been widely alleged that the Vatican Bank covertly funded Solidarity.

In 1984, the foreign policy of the Ronald Reagan administration saw opened diplomatic relations with the Vatican for the first time since 1870. In sharp contrast to the long history of strong domestic opposition, this time there was very little opposition from Congress, the courts, and Protestant groups. Relations between Reagan and John Paul II were close, especially because of their shared anti-communism and keen interest in forcing the Soviets out of Poland. Reagan's correspondence with the pope reveals "a continuous scurrying to shore up Vatican support for U.S. policies. Perhaps most surprisingly, the papers show that, as late as 1984, the pope did not believe the Communist Polish government could be changed."

"No one can prove conclusively that he was a primary cause of the end of communism. However, the major figures on all sides—not just Lech Wałęsa, the Polish Solidarity leader, but also Solidarity's arch-opponent, General Wojciech Jaruzelski; not just the former American president George Bush Senior but also the former Soviet president Mikhail Gorbachev—now agree that he was. I would argue the historical case in three steps: without the Polish Pope, no Solidarity revolution in Poland in 1980; without Solidarity, no dramatic change in Soviet policy towards eastern Europe under Gorbachev; without that change, no velvet revolutions in 1989."

In December 1989, John Paul II met with the Soviet leader Mikhail Gorbachev at the Vatican and each expressed his respect and admiration for the other. Gorbachev once said: "The collapse of the Iron Curtain would have been impossible without John Paul II." On John Paul II's death, Gorbachev said: "Pope John Paul II's devotion to his followers is a remarkable example to all of us."

On 4 June 2004, U.S. president George W. Bush presented the Presidential Medal of Freedom, the United States' highest civilian honour, to John Paul II during a ceremony at the Apostolic Palace. The president read the citation that accompanied the medal, which recognised "this son of Poland" whose "principled stand for peace and freedom has inspired millions and helped to topple communism and tyranny".
After receiving the award, John Paul II said, "May the desire for freedom, peace, a more humane world symbolised by this medal inspire men and women of goodwill in every time and place."

Communist attempt to compromise John Paul II 

In 1983, Poland's Communist government unsuccessfully tried to humiliate John Paul II by falsely saying he had fathered an illegitimate child. Section D of Służba Bezpieczeństwa (SB), the security service, had an action named "Triangolo" to carry out criminal operations against the Catholic Church; the operation encompassed all Polish hostile actions against the pope. Captain Grzegorz Piotrowski, one of the murderers of beatified Jerzy Popiełuszko, was the leader of section D. They drugged Irena Kinaszewska, the secretary of the Kraków-based weekly Catholic magazine Tygodnik Powszechny where Wojtyła had worked, and unsuccessfully attempted to make her admit to having had sexual relations with him.

The SB then attempted to compromise Kraków priest Andrzej Bardecki, an editor of Tygodnik Powszechny and one of the closest friends of Cardinal Wojtyła before he became pope, by planting false memoirs in his dwelling; Piotrowski was exposed and the forgeries were found and destroyed before the SB could say to have discovered them.

Relations with other Christian denominations 
John Paul II travelled extensively and met with believers from many divergent faiths. At the World Day of Prayer for Peace, held in Assisi on 27 October 1986, more than 120 representatives of different religions and denominations spent a day of fasting and prayer.

Churches of the East

Although the contact between the Holy See and many Christians of the East had never totally ceased, communion had been interrupted since ancient times. Again, the history of conflict in Central Europe was a complex part of John Paul II's personal cultural heritage which made him all the more determined to react so as to attempt to overcome abiding difficulties, given that relatively speaking the Holy See and the non-Catholic Eastern Churches are close in many points of faith.

Eastern Orthodox Church 

In May 1999, John Paul II visited Romania on the invitation from Patriarch Teoctist Arăpaşu of the Romanian Orthodox Church. This was the first time a pope had visited a predominantly Eastern Orthodox country since the Great Schism in 1054. On his arrival, the Patriarch and the President of Romania, Emil Constantinescu, greeted the pope. The Patriarch stated, "The second millennium of Christian history began with a painful wounding of the unity of the Church; the end of this millennium has seen a real commitment to restoring Christian unity."

On 23–27 June 2001, John Paul II visited Ukraine, another heavily Orthodox nation, at the invitation of the President of Ukraine and bishops of the Ukrainian Greek Catholic Church. The Pope spoke to leaders of the All-Ukrainian Council of Churches and Religious Organisations, pleading for "open, tolerant and honest dialogue". About 200 thousand people attended the liturgies celebrated by the Pope in Kyiv, and the liturgy in Lviv gathered nearly one and a half million faithful. John Paul II said that an end to the Great Schism was one of his fondest wishes. Healing divisions between the Catholic and Eastern Orthodox Churches regarding Latin and Byzantine traditions was clearly of great personal interest. For many years, John Paul II sought to facilitate dialogue and unity stating as early as 1988 in Euntes in mundum, "Europe has two lungs, it will never breathe easily until it uses both of them."

During his 2001 travels, John Paul II became the first pope to visit Greece in 1291 years. In Athens, the pope met with Archbishop Christodoulos, the head of the Church of Greece. After a private 30-minute meeting, the two spoke publicly. Christodoulos read a list of "13 offences" of the Catholic Church against the Eastern Orthodox Church since the Great Schism, including the pillaging of Constantinople by crusaders in 1204, and bemoaned the lack of apology from the Catholic Church, saying "Until now, there has not been heard a single request for pardon" for the "maniacal crusaders of the 13th century".

The pope responded by saying "For the occasions past and present, when sons and daughters of the Catholic Church have sinned by action or omission against their Orthodox brothers and sisters, may the Lord grant us forgiveness", to which Christodoulos immediately applauded. John Paul II said that the sacking of Constantinople was a source of "profound regret" for Catholics. Later John Paul II and Christodoulos met on a spot where Paul of Tarsus had once preached to Athenian Christians. They issued a common declaration saying, "We shall do everything in our power, so that the Christian roots of Europe and its Christian soul may be preserved.... We condemn all recourse to violence, proselytism and fanaticism, in the name of religion." The two leaders then said the Lord's Prayer together, breaking an Orthodox taboo against praying with Catholics.

The pope had said throughout his pontificate that one of his greatest dreams was to visit Russia, but this never occurred. He attempted to solve the problems that had arisen over centuries between the Catholic and Russian Orthodox churches, and in 2004 gave them a 1730 copy of the lost icon of Our Lady of Kazan.

Armenian Apostolic Church 
John Paul II was determined to maintain good relations with the Armenian Apostolic Church, whose separation from the Holy See dated to Christian antiquity. In 1996, he brought the Catholic Church and the Armenian Apostolic Church closer by agreeing with Armenian Archbishop Karekin II on Christ's nature. During an audience in 2000, John Paul II and Karekin II, by then the Catholicos of All Armenians, issued a joint statement condemning the Armenian genocide. Meanwhile, the pope gave Karekin the relics of St. Gregory the Illuminator, the first head of the Armenian Church that had been kept in Naples, Italy, for 500 years. In September 2001, John Paul II went on a three-day pilgrimage to Armenia to take part in an ecumenical celebration with Karekin II in the newly consecrated St. Gregory the Illuminator Cathedral in Yerevan. The two Church leaders signed a declaration remembering the victims of the Armenian genocide.

Protestantism
Like his successors after him, John Paul II took a large number of initiatives to promote friendly relations, practical humanitarian cooperation and theological dialogue with a range of Protestant bodies. Of these the first in importance had to be with Lutheranism, given that the contention with Martin Luther and his followers was the most significant historical split in Western Christianity.

Lutheranism 

From 15 to 19 November 1980, John Paul II visited West Germany on his first trip to a country with a large Lutheran Protestant population. In Mainz, he met with leaders of the Evangelical Church in Germany, and with representatives of other Christian denominations.

On 11 December 1983, John Paul II participated in an ecumenical service in the Evangelical Lutheran Church in Rome, the first papal visit ever to a Lutheran church. The visit took place 500 years after the birth of the German Martin Luther, who was first an Augustinian friar and subsequently a leading Protestant Reformer.

In his apostolic pilgrimage to Norway, Iceland, Finland, Denmark and Sweden of June 1989, John Paul II became the first pope to visit countries with Lutheran majorities. In addition to celebrating Mass with Catholic believers, he participated in ecumenical services at places that had been Catholic shrines before the Reformation: Nidaros Cathedral in Norway; near St. Olav's Church at Thingvellir in Iceland; Turku Cathedral in Finland; Roskilde Cathedral in Denmark; and Uppsala Cathedral in Sweden.

On 31 October 1999, (the 482nd anniversary of Reformation Day, Martin Luther's posting of the 95 Theses), representatives of the Catholic Church's Pontifical Council for Promoting Christian Unity and the Lutheran World Federation signed a Joint Declaration on the Doctrine of Justification, as a gesture of unity. The signing was a fruit of a theological dialogue that had been going on between the Lutheran World Federation and the Holy See since 1965.

Anglicanism 
John Paul II had good relations with the Church of England, as also with other parts of the Anglican Communion. He was the first reigning pope to travel to the United Kingdom, in 1982, where he met Queen Elizabeth II, the Supreme Governor of the Church of England. He preached in Canterbury Cathedral and received Robert Runcie, the Archbishop of Canterbury. He said that he was disappointed by the Church of England's decision to ordain women and saw it as a step away from unity between the Anglican Communion and the Catholic Church.

In 1980, John Paul II issued a Pastoral Provision allowing married former Episcopal priests to become Catholic priests, and for the acceptance of former Episcopal Church parishes into the Catholic Church. He allowed the creation of a form of the Roman Rite, known informally by some as the Anglican Use, which incorporates selected elements of the Anglican Book of Common Prayer that are compatible with Catholic doctrine. He permitted Archbishop Patrick Flores of San Antonio, Texas, to establish Our Lady of the Atonement Catholic Church, together as the inaugural parish for the use of this hybrid liturgy.

Relations with Judaism 

Relations between Catholicism and Judaism improved dramatically during the pontificate of John Paul II. He spoke frequently about the Catholic Church's relationship with the Jewish faith. It is likely that his attitude was shaped in part by his own experience of the terrible fate of the Jews in Poland and the rest of Central Europe in the 1930s and 1940s.

In 1979, John Paul II visited the Auschwitz concentration camp in Poland, where many of his compatriots (mostly Jews) had perished during the German occupation there in World War II, the first pope to do so. In 1998, he issued We Remember: A Reflection on the Shoah, which outlined his thinking on the Holocaust. He became the first pope known to have made an official papal visit to a synagogue, when he visited the Great Synagogue of Rome on 13 April 1986.

On 30 December 1993, John Paul II established formal diplomatic relations between the Holy See and the State of Israel, acknowledging its centrality in Jewish life and faith.

On 7 April 1994, he hosted the Papal Concert to Commemorate the Holocaust. It was the first-ever Vatican event dedicated to the memory of the six million Jews murdered in World War II. This concert, which was conceived and conducted by US conductor Gilbert Levine, was attended by the Chief Rabbi of Rome Elio Toaff, the President of Italy Oscar Luigi Scalfaro, and survivors of the Holocaust from around the world. The Royal Philharmonic Orchestra, actor Richard Dreyfuss and cellist Lynn Harrell performed on this occasion under Levine's direction. On the morning of the concert, the pope received the attending members of survivor community in a special audience in the Apostolic Palace.

In March 2000, John Paul II visited Yad Vashem, the national Holocaust memorial in Israel, and later made history by touching one of the holiest sites in Judaism, the Western Wall in Jerusalem, placing a letter inside it (in which he prayed for forgiveness for the actions against Jews). In part of his address he said: "I assure the Jewish people the Catholic Church ... is deeply saddened by the hatred, acts of persecution and displays of anti-Semitism directed against the Jews by Christians at any time and in any place." He added that there were "no words strong enough to deplore the terrible tragedy of the Holocaust." He added: "We are deeply saddened by the behaviour of those who in the course of history have caused these children of yours to suffer, and asking your forgiveness we wish to commit ourselves to genuine brotherhood with the people of the Covenant." Israeli cabinet minister Rabbi Michael Melchior, who hosted the pope's visit, said he was "very moved" by the pope's gesture. He said: "It was beyond history, beyond memory."

In October 2003, the Anti-Defamation League (ADL) issued a statement congratulating John Paul II on entering the 25th year of his papacy. In January 2005, John Paul II became the first pope known to receive a priestly blessing from a rabbi, when Rabbis Benjamin Blech, Barry Dov Schwartz, and Jack Bemporad visited the Pontiff at Clementine Hall in the Apostolic Palace.

Immediately after John Paul II's death, the Anti-Defamation League said in a statement that he had revolutionised Catholic-Jewish relations, saying that "more change for the better took place in his 27-year Papacy than in the nearly 2,000 years before." In another statement issued by the Australia/Israel & Jewish Affairs Council, Director Dr Colin Rubenstein said, "The Pope will be remembered for his inspiring spiritual leadership in the cause of freedom and humanity. He achieved far more in terms of transforming relations with both the Jewish people and the State of Israel than any other figure in the history of the Catholic Church." In April 1986, John Paul II said: "With Judaism, therefore, we have a relationship which we do not have with any other religion. You are our dearly beloved brothers, and in a certain way, it could be said that you are our elder brothers."

In an interview with the Polish Press Agency, Michael Schudrich, chief rabbi of Poland, said that never in history did anyone do as much for Christian-Jewish dialogue as John Paul II, adding that many Jews had a greater respect for the late pope than for some rabbis. Schudrich praised John Paul II for condemning anti-Semitism as a sin, which no previous pope had done.

On John Paul II's beatification the Chief Rabbi of Rome Riccardo Di Segni said in an interview with the Vatican newspaper L'Osservatore Romano that "John Paul II was revolutionary because he tore down a thousand-year wall of Catholic distrust of the Jewish world." Meanwhile, Elio Toaff, the former Chief Rabbi of Rome, said that:

"Remembrance of the Pope Karol Wojtyła will remain strong in the collective Jewish memory because of his appeals to fraternity and the spirit of tolerance, which excludes all violence. In the stormy history of relations between Roman popes and Jews in the ghetto in which they were closed for over three centuries in humiliating circumstances, John Paul II is a bright figure in his uniqueness. In relations between our two great religions in the new century that was stained with bloody wars and the plague of racism, the heritage of John Paul II remains one of the few spiritual islands guaranteeing survival and human progress."

Relations with other world religions

Animism 
In his book-length interview Crossing the Threshold of Hope with the Italian journalist Vittorio Messori published in 1995, John Paul II draws parallels between animism and Christianity. He wrote:

"... it would be helpful to recall ... the animist religions which stress ancestor worship. It seems that those who practice them are particularly close to Christianity, and among them, the Church's missionaries also find it easier to speak a common language. Is there, perhaps, in this veneration of ancestors a kind of preparation for the Christian faith in the Communion of Saints, in which all believers—whether living or dead—form a single community, a single body? ... There is nothing strange, then, that the African and Asian animists would become believers in Christ more easily than followers of the great religions of the Far East."

In 1985, the pope visited the African country of Togo, where 60 per cent of the population espouses animist beliefs. To honour the pope, animist religious leaders met him at a Catholic Marian shrine in the forest, much to the pontiff's delight. John Paul II proceeded to call for the need for religious tolerance, praised nature, and emphasised common elements between animism and Christianity, saying:

"Nature, exuberant and splendid in this area of forests and lakes, impregnates spirits and hearts with its mystery and orients them spontaneously toward the mystery of He who is the author of life. It is this religious sentiment that animates you and one can say that animates all of your compatriots."

During the investiture of President Thomas Boni Yayi of Benin as a titled Yoruba chieftain on 20 December 2008, the reigning Ooni of Ile-Ife, Nigeria, Olubuse II, referred to John Paul II as a previous recipient of the same royal honour.

Buddhism 
Tenzin Gyatso, the 14th Dalai Lama, visited John Paul II eight times. The two men held many similar views and understood similar plights, both coming from nations affected by Communism and both serving as heads of major religious bodies. As Archbishop of Kraków, long before the 14th Dalai Lama was a world-famous figure, Wojtyła held special Masses to pray for the Tibetan people's non-violent struggle for freedom from Maoist China. During his 1995 visit to Sri Lanka, a country where a majority of the population adheres to Theravada Buddhism, John Paul II expressed his admiration for Buddhism. He said:

"In particular I express my highest regard for the followers of Buddhism, the majority religion in Sri Lanka, with its ... four great values of … loving kindness, compassion, sympathetic joy and equanimity; with its ten transcendental virtues and the joys of the Sangha expressed so beautifully in the Theragathas. I ardently hope that my visit will serve to strengthen the goodwill between us, and that it will reassure everyone of the Catholic Church's desire for interreligious dialogue and cooperation in building a more just and fraternal world. To everyone I extend the hand of friendship, recalling the splendid words of the Dhammapada: 'Better than a thousand useless words is one single word that gives peace' ... ."

Islam 

John Paul II made considerable efforts to improve relations between Catholicism and Islam.

He officially supported the project of the Great Mosque in Rome and participated in the inauguration in 1995.

On 6 May 2001, he became the first Catholic pope to enter and pray in a mosque, namely the Umayyad Mosque in Damascus, Syria. Respectfully removing his shoes, he entered the former Byzantine-era Christian church dedicated to John the Baptist, who is also revered as a prophet of Islam. He gave a speech including the statement: "For all the times that Muslims and Christians have offended one another, we need to seek forgiveness from the Almighty and to offer each other forgiveness." He also kissed the Qur'an while in Syria, an act that made him popular among Muslims but disturbed many Catholics.

In 2004, John Paul II hosted the "Papal Concert of Reconciliation", which brought together leaders of Islam with leaders of the Jewish community and of the Catholic Church at the Vatican for a concert by the Kraków Philharmonic Choir from Poland, the London Philharmonic Choir from the United Kingdom, the Pittsburgh Symphony Orchestra from the United States, and the Ankara State Polyphonic Choir of Turkey. The event was conceived and conducted by Sir Gilbert Levine, KCSG and was broadcast throughout the world.

John Paul II oversaw the publication of the Catechism of the Catholic Church, which makes a special provision for Muslims; therein, it is written, "together with us they adore the one, merciful God, mankind's judge on the last day."

Jainism 
In 1995, John Paul II held a meeting with 21 Jains, organised by the Pontifical Council for Interreligious Dialogue. He praised Mohandas Gandhi for his "unshakeable faith in God", assured the Jains that the Catholic Church will continue to engage in dialogue with their religion and spoke of the common need to aid the poor. The Jain leaders were impressed with the pope's "transparency and simplicity", and the meeting received much attention in the Gujarat state in western India, home to many Jains.

Assassination attempts and plots 

As he entered St. Peter's Square to address an audience on 13 May 1981, John Paul II was shot and critically wounded by Mehmet Ali Ağca, an expert Turkish gunman who was a member of the militant fascist group Grey Wolves. The assassin used a Browning 9 mm semi-automatic pistol, shooting the pope in the abdomen and perforating his colon and small intestine multiple times. John Paul II was rushed into the Vatican complex and then to the Gemelli Hospital. On the way to the hospital, he lost consciousness. Even though the two bullets missed his superior mesenteric artery and abdominal aorta, he lost nearly three-quarters of his blood. He underwent five hours of surgery to treat his wounds. Surgeons performed a colostomy, temporarily rerouting the upper part of the large intestine to let the damaged lower part heal. When he briefly regained consciousness before being operated on, he instructed the doctors not to remove his Brown Scapular during the operation. One of the few people allowed in to see him at the Gemelli Clinic was one of his closest friends philosopher Anna-Teresa Tymieniecka, who arrived on Saturday 16 May and kept him company while he recovered from emergency surgery. The pope later stated that the Blessed Virgin Mary helped keep him alive throughout his ordeal. He said:

"Could I forget that the event in St. Peter's Square took place on the day and at the hour when the first appearance of the Mother of Christ to the poor little peasants has been remembered for over sixty years at Fátima, Portugal? For in everything that happened to me on that very day, I felt that extraordinary motherly protection and care, which turned out to be stronger than the deadly bullet."

Ağca was caught and restrained by a nun and other bystanders until police arrived. He was sentenced to life imprisonment. Two days after Christmas in 1983, John Paul II visited Ağca in prison. John Paul II and Ağca spoke privately for about twenty minutes. John Paul II said, "What we talked about will have to remain a secret between him and me. I spoke to him as a brother whom I have pardoned and who has my complete trust."

Numerous other theories were advanced to explain the assassination attempt, some of them controversial. One such theory, advanced by Michael Ledeen and heavily pushed by the United States Central Intelligence Agency at the time of the assassination but never substantiated by evidence, was that the Soviet Union was behind the attempt on John Paul II's life in retaliation for the pope's support of Solidarity, the Catholic, pro-democratic Polish workers' movement. This theory was supported by the 2006 Mitrokhin Commission, set up by Silvio Berlusconi and headed by Forza Italia senator Paolo Guzzanti, which alleged that Communist Bulgarian security departments were utilised to prevent the Soviet Union's role from being uncovered, and concluded that Soviet military intelligence (Glavnoje Razvedyvatel'noje Upravlenije), not the KGB, were responsible. Russian Foreign Intelligence Service spokesman Boris Labusov called the accusation "absurd". The pope declared during a May 2002 visit to Bulgaria that the country's Soviet-bloc-era leadership had nothing to do with the assassination attempt. However, his secretary, Cardinal Stanisław Dziwisz, alleged in his book A Life with Karol, that the pope was convinced privately that the former Soviet Union was behind the attack. It was later discovered that many of John Paul II's aides had foreign-government attachments; Bulgaria and Russia disputed the Italian commission's conclusions, pointing out that the pope had publicly denied the Bulgarian connection.

A second assassination attempt was made on 12 May 1982, just a day before the anniversary of the first attempt on his life, in Fátima, Portugal, when a man tried to stab John Paul II with a bayonet. He was stopped by security guards. Stanisław Dziwisz later said that John Paul II had been injured during the attempt but managed to hide a non-life-threatening wound. The assailant, a traditionalist Catholic Spanish priest named Juan María Fernández y Krohn, had been ordained as a priest by Archbishop Marcel Lefebvre of the Society of St. Pius X and was opposed to the changes made by the Second Vatican Council, saying that the pope was an agent of Communist Moscow and of the Marxist Eastern Bloc. Fernández y Krohn subsequently left the priesthood and served three years of a six-year sentence. The ex-priest was treated for mental illness and then expelled from Portugal to become a solicitor in Belgium.

The Al-Qaeda-funded Bojinka plot planned to kill John Paul II during a visit to the Philippines during World Youth Day 1995 celebrations. On 15 January 1995 a suicide bomber was planning to dress as a priest and detonate a bomb when the pope passed in his motorcade on his way to the San Carlos Seminary in Makati. The assassination was supposed to divert attention from the next phase of the operation. However, a chemical fire inadvertently started by the cell alerted police to their whereabouts, and all were arrested a week before the pope's visit, and confessed to the plot.

In 2009 John Koehler, a journalist and former army intelligence officer, published Spies in the Vatican: The Soviet Union's Cold War Against the Catholic Church. Mining mostly East German and Polish secret police archives, Koehler claimed the assassination attempts were "KGB-backed" and provided details.

Apologies 

John Paul II apologised to many groups that had suffered at the hands of the Catholic Church through the years. Before becoming pope he had been a prominent editor and supporter of initiatives such as the Letter of Reconciliation of the Polish Bishops to the German Bishops from 1965. As pope, he officially made public apologies for over 100 wrongdoings, including:
 The legal process on the Italian scientist and philosopher Galileo Galilei, himself a devout Catholic, around 1633 (31 October 1992).
 Catholics' involvement with the African chiefs who sold their subjects and captives in the African slave trade (9 August 1993).
 The church hierarchy's role in burnings at the stake and the religious wars that followed the Protestant Reformation (20 May 1995, in the Czech Republic).
 The injustices committed against women, the violation of women's rights and the historical denigration of women (10 July 1995, in a letter to "every woman").
 The inactivity and silence of many Catholics during the Holocaust (see the article Religion in Nazi Germany) (16 March 1998).

The Great Jubilee of the year 2000 included a day of Prayer for Forgiveness of the Sins of the Church on 12 March 2000.

On 20 November 2001, from a laptop in the Vatican, John Paul II sent his first e-mail apologising for the Catholic sex abuse cases, the church-backed "Stolen Generations" of Aboriginal children in Australia, and to China for the behaviour of Catholic missionaries in colonial times.

Health 

When he became pope in 1978 at the age of 58, John Paul II was an avid sportsman. He was extremely healthy and active, jogging in the Vatican gardens, weight training, swimming, and hiking in the mountains. He was fond of football. The media contrasted the new pope's athleticism and trim figure to the poor health of John Paul I and Paul VI, the portliness of John XXIII and the constant claims of ailments of Pius XII. The only modern pope with a fitness regimen had been Pope Pius XI (1922–1939), who was an avid mountaineer. An Irish Independent article in the 1980s labelled John Paul II the keep-fit pope.

However, after over twenty-six years as pope, two assassination attempts, one of which injured him severely, and a number of cancer scares, John Paul's physical health declined. In 2001 he was diagnosed as suffering from Parkinson's disease. International observers had suspected this for some time, but it was only publicly acknowledged by the Vatican in 2003. Despite difficulty speaking more than a few sentences at a time, trouble hearing, and severe osteoarthrosis, he continued to tour the world although rarely walking in public.

Death and funeral

Final months 

John Paul II was hospitalised with breathing problems caused by a bout of influenza on 1 February 2005. He left the hospital on 10 February, but was subsequently hospitalised again with breathing problems two weeks later and underwent a tracheotomy.

Final illness and death 

On 31 March 2005, following a urinary tract infection, he developed septic shock, a form of infection with a high fever and low blood pressure, but was not hospitalised. Instead, he was monitored by a team of consultants at his private residence. This was taken as an indication by the pope, and those close to him, that he was nearing death; it would have been in accordance with his wishes to die in the Vatican. Later that day, Vatican sources announced that John Paul II had been given the Anointing of the Sick by his friend and secretary Stanisław Dziwisz. The day before his death, one of his closest personal friends, Anna-Teresa Tymieniecka visited him at his bedside. During the final days of the pope's life, the lights were kept burning through the night where he lay in the Papal apartment on the top floor of the Apostolic Palace. Tens of thousands of people assembled and held vigil in St. Peter's Square and the surrounding streets for two days. Upon hearing of this, the dying pope was said to have stated: "I have searched for you, and now you have come to me, and I thank you."

On Saturday, 2 April 2005, at approximately 15:30 CEST, John Paul II spoke his final words in Polish, "Pozwólcie mi odejść do domu Ojca" ("Allow me to depart to the house of the Father"), to his aides, and fell into a coma about four hours later. The Mass of the vigil of the Second Sunday of Easter commemorating the canonisation of Maria Faustina on 30 April 2000, had just been celebrated at his bedside, presided over by Stanisław Dziwisz and two Polish associates. Present at the bedside was a cardinal Lubomyr Husar from Ukraine, who served as a priest with John Paul in Poland, along with Polish nuns of the Congregation of the Sisters, Servants of the Most Sacred Heart of Jesus, who ran the papal household. John Paul II died in his private apartment at 21:37 CEST (19:37 UTC) of heart failure from profound hypotension and complete circulatory collapse from septic shock. His death was verified when an electrocardiogram that ran for 20 minutes showed a flatline.
He had no close family by the time of his death; his feelings are reflected in his words written in 2000 at the end of his Last Will and Testament. Stanisław Dziwisz later said he had not burned the pontiff's personal notes despite the request being part of the will.

Aftermath 

The death of the pontiff set in motion rituals and traditions dating back to medieval times. The Rite of Visitation took place from 4 April 2005 to 7 April 2005 at St. Peter's Basilica. John Paul II's testament, published on 7 April 2005, revealed that the pontiff contemplated being buried in his native Poland but left the final decision to The College of Cardinals, which in passing, preferred burial beneath St. Peter's Basilica, honouring the pontiff's request to be placed "in bare earth".

The Requiem Mass held on 8 April 2005 was said to have set world records both for attendance and number of heads of state present at a funeral. (See: List of Dignitaries.) It was the single largest gathering of heads of state up to that time, surpassing the funerals of Winston Churchill (1965) and Josip Broz Tito (1980). Four kings, five queens, at least 70 presidents and prime ministers, and more than 14 leaders of other religions attended. An estimated four million mourners gathered in and around Vatican City. Between 250,000 and 300,000 watched the event from within the Vatican's walls. In a historical rarity, Protestant and Eastern Orthodox leaders, as well as representatives and heads from Judaism, Islam, Druze and Buddhism, offered their own memorials and prayers as a way of sympathising with the grief of Catholics.

The Dean of the College of Cardinals, Cardinal Joseph Ratzinger, conducted the ceremony. John Paul II was interred in the grottoes under the basilica, the Tomb of the Popes. He was lowered into a tomb created in the same alcove previously occupied by the remains of John XXIII. The alcove had been empty since John XXIII's remains had been moved into the main body of the basilica after his beatification.

Posthumous recognition

Title "the Great" 
Upon the death of John Paul II, a number of clergy at the Vatican and laymen began referring to the late pontiff as "John Paul the Great" — in theory only the fourth pope to be so acclaimed. Cardinal Angelo Sodano specifically referred to John Paul as "the Great" in his published written homily for the pope's funeral Mass of Repose. The South African Catholic newspaper The Southern Cross has referred to him in print as "John Paul II the Great". Some Catholic educational institutions in the US have additionally changed their names to incorporate "the Great", including John Paul the Great Catholic University and schools called some variant of John Paul the Great High School.

Scholars of canon law say that there is no official process for declaring a pope "Great"; the title simply establishes itself through popular and continued usage, as was the case with celebrated secular leaders (for example, Alexander III of Macedon became popularly known as Alexander the Great). The three popes who today commonly are known as "Great" are Leo I, who reigned from 440–461 and persuaded Attila the Hun to withdraw from Rome; Gregory I, 590–604, after whom the Gregorian Chant is named; and Pope Nicholas I, 858–867, who consolidated the Catholic Church in the Western world in the Middle Ages.

John Paul's successor, Benedict XVI, has not used the term directly in public speeches, but has made oblique references to "the great Pope John Paul II" in his first address from the loggia of St. Peter's Basilica, at the 20th World Youth Day in Germany 2005 when he said in Polish: "As the great Pope John Paul II would say: Keep the flame of faith alive in your lives and your people"; and in May 2006 during a visit to Poland where he repeatedly made references to "the great John Paul" and "my great predecessor".

Institutions named after John Paul II 
 Pope John Paul II High School (Tennessee)
 John Paul the Great Catholic University
 John Paul the Great Catholic High School (Indiana)
 John Paul II Catholic Secondary School (London, Ontario, Canada)
 John Paul II Catholic University of Lublin
 Saint John Paul the Great Catholic High School (Virginia)
 John Paul II High School, Greymouth
 Karol Wojtyla College, Lima, Peru
Scoil Eoin Phóil, Leixlip, Ireland
 John Paul II Gymnasium, Kaunas, Lithuania
Pope John Paul II High School in Olympia, Washington
 Universidad Privada Juan Pablo II, Lima, Peru 
 Karol Wojtyła building at Atma Jaya Catholic University of Indonesia in Jakarta, Indonesia
St. John Paul II Chapel and Museum at Pakuwon Mall in Surabaya, Indonesia
St. John Paul II Minor Seminary, Minor Seminary in Antipolo City, Philippines
St. John Paul II Parish Community (Lake View, NY)
 St. John Paul II High School (Hyannis, MA)
 Saint John Paul II Academy Boca Raton, FL
 St. John Paul II Catholic High School (Alabama)
 St. John Paul II Catholic High School (Arizona)
 St. John Paul II Seminary (Washington, DC)
 Pope Saint John Paul II Major Seminary Awka (Nigeria)
 St. John Paul II Catholic Secondary School, Scarborough, Ontario, Canada
 Pope John Paul II High School, Royersford Pennsylvania, USA

Beatification 

Inspired by calls of "Santo Subito!" ("[Make him a] Saint Immediately!") from the crowds gathered during the funeral Mass that he celebrated, Benedict XVI began the beatification process for his predecessor, bypassing the normal restriction that five years must pass after a person's death before beginning the beatification process. In an audience with Pope Benedict XVI, Camillo Ruini, Vicar General of the Diocese of Rome, who was responsible for promoting the cause for canonisation of any person who died within that diocese, cited "exceptional circumstances", which suggested that the waiting period could be waived. This decision was announced on 13 May 2005, the Feast of Our Lady of Fátima and the 24th anniversary of the assassination attempt on John Paul II at St. Peter's Square.

In early 2006, it was reported that the Vatican was investigating a possible miracle associated with John Paul II. Sister Marie Simon-Pierre, a French nun and member of the Congregation of Little Sisters of Catholic Maternity Wards, confined to her bed by
Parkinson's disease, was reported to have experienced a "complete and lasting cure after members of her community prayed for the intercession of Pope John Paul II". , Sister Marie-Simon-Pierre, then 46, was working again at a maternity hospital run by her religious institute.

"I was sick and now I am cured," she told reporter Gerry Shaw. "I am cured, but it is up to the church to say whether it was a miracle or not."

On 28 May 2006, Pope Benedict XVI celebrated Mass before an estimated 900,000 people in John Paul II's native Poland. During his homily, he encouraged prayers for the early canonisation of John Paul II and stated that he hoped canonisation would happen "in the near future".

In January 2007, Cardinal Stanisław Dziwisz announced that the interview phase of the beatification process, in Italy and Poland, was nearing completion. In February 2007, second class relics of John Paul II—pieces of white papal cassocks he used to wear—were freely distributed with prayer cards for the cause, a typical pious practice after a saintly Catholic's death. On 8 March 2007, the Vicariate of Rome announced that the diocesan phase of John Paul's cause for beatification was at an end. Following a ceremony on 2 April 2007—the second anniversary of the Pontiff's death—the cause proceeded to the scrutiny of the committee of lay, clerical, and episcopal members of the Vatican's Congregation for the Causes of Saints, to conduct a separate investigation. On the fourth anniversary of John Paul II's death, 2 April 2009, Cardinal Dziwisz, told reporters of a presumed miracle that had recently occurred at the former pope's tomb in St. Peter's Basilica. A nine-year-old Polish boy from Gdańsk, who was suffering from kidney cancer and was completely unable to walk, had been visiting the tomb with his parents. On leaving St. Peter's Basilica, the boy told them, "I want to walk," and began walking normally. On 16 November 2009, a panel of reviewers at the Congregation for the Causes of Saints voted unanimously that John Paul II had lived a life of heroic virtue. On 19 December 2009, Pope Benedict XVI signed the first of two decrees needed for beatification and proclaimed John Paul II "Venerable", asserting that he had lived a heroic, virtuous life. The second vote and the second signed decree certifying the authenticity of the first miracle, the curing of Sister Marie Simon-Pierre, a French nun, from Parkinson's disease. Once the second decree is signed, the position (the report on the cause, with documentation about his life and writings and with information on the cause) is complete. He can then be beatified. Some speculated that he would be beatified sometime during (or soon after) the month of the 32nd anniversary of his 1978 election, in October 2010. As Monsignor Oder said, this course would have been possible if the second decree were signed in time by Benedict XVI, stating that a posthumous miracle directly attributable to his intercession had occurred, completing the positio.

The Vatican announced on 14 January 2011 that Pope Benedict XVI had confirmed the miracle involving Sister Marie Simon-Pierre and that John Paul II was to be beatified on 1 May, the Feast of Divine Mercy. 1 May is commemorated in former Communist countries, such as Poland, and some Western European countries as May Day, and John Paul II was well known for his contributions to Communism's relatively peaceful demise. In March 2011 the Polish mint issued a gold 1,000 Polish złoty coin (equivalent to US$350), with the Pope's image to commemorate his beatification.

On 29 April 2011, John Paul II's coffin was disinterred from the grotto beneath St. Peter's Basilica ahead of his beatification, as tens of thousands of people arrived in Rome for one of the biggest events since his funeral. John Paul II's remains, which were not exposed, were placed in front of the Basilica's main altar, where believers could pay their respect before and after the beatification mass in St. Peter's Square on 1 May 2011. On 3 May 2011 his remains were interred in the marble altar in Pier Paolo Cristofari Chapel of St. Sebastian, where Pope Innocent XI was buried. This more prominent location, next to the Chapel of the Pietà, the Chapel of the Blessed Sacrament, and statues of Popes Pius XI and Pius XII was intended to allow more pilgrims to view his memorial. John Paul II's body is located near the bodies of Pope Pius X and Pope John XXIII, whose bodies were reinterred in the Basilica after their own beatifications and together are three of the five popes beatified in the last century. The two popes who were not exhumed and reinterred after becoming a blessed in the last century were Pope Paul VI and Pope John Paul I, who both remain entombed in the papal grottos.

In July 2012, a Colombian man, Marco Fidel Rojas, the former mayor of Huila, Colombia, testified that he was "miraculously cured" of Parkinson's disease after a trip to Rome where he met John Paul II and prayed with him. Dr. Antonio Schlesinger Piedrahita, a renowned neurologist in Colombia, certified Fidel's healing. The documentation was then sent to the Vatican office for sainthood causes.

In the same month, a relic containing his blood was stolen from the Spoleto Cathedral in Italy.

Canonisation 

To be eligible for canonisation (being declared a saint) by the Catholic Church, two miracles must be attributed to a candidate.

The first miracle attributed to John Paul was the above mentioned healing of a man's Parkinson's disease, which was recognised during the beatification process. According to an article on the Catholic News Service (CNS) dated 23 April 2013, a Vatican commission of doctors concluded that a healing had no natural (medical) explanation, which is the first requirement for a claimed miracle to be officially documented.

The second miracle was deemed to have taken place shortly after the late pope's beatification on 1 May 2011; it was reported to be the healing of Costa Rican woman Floribeth Mora of an otherwise terminal brain aneurysm. A Vatican panel of expert theologians examined the evidence, determined that it was directly attributable to the intercession of John Paul II, and recognised it as miraculous. The next stage was for Cardinals who compose the membership of the Congregation for the Causes of Saints to give their opinion to Pope Francis to decide whether to sign and promulgate the decree and set a date for canonisation.

On 4 July 2013, Pope Francis confirmed his approval of John Paul II's canonisation, formally recognising the second miracle attributed to his intercession. He was canonised together with John XXIII. The date of the canonisation was on 27 April 2014, Divine Mercy Sunday.

The canonisation Mass for Pope John Paul II and Pope John XXIII, was celebrated by Pope Francis (with Pope Emeritus Benedict XVI), on 27 April 2014 in St. Peter's Square at the Vatican (John Paul II had died on vigil of Divine Mercy Sunday in 2005). About 150 cardinals and 700 bishops concelebrated the Mass, and at least 500,000 people attended the Mass, with an estimated 300,000 others watching from video screens placed around Rome.

The new saint's remains, considered to be holy relics, were exhumed from their place in the basilica's grotto, and a new tomb was established at the altar of St. Sebastian.

Beatification of the Pope's parents
On 10 October 2019, the Archdiocese of Krakow and the Polish Bishops' Conference approved nihil obstat the opening of the beatification cause of the parents of its patron saint John Paul II, Karol Wojtyła Sr. and Emilia Kaczorowska. It gained approval from the Holy See to open the diocesan phase of the cause on 7 May 2020.

Sexual abuse scandals 

John Paul II was criticised by representatives of the victims of clergy sexual abuse for failing to respond quickly enough to the Catholic sex abuse crisis. In his response, he stated that "there is no place in the priesthood and religious life for those who would harm the young." The Catholic Church instituted reforms to prevent future abuse by requiring background checks for church employees and, because a significant majority of victims were boys, disallowing ordination of men with "deep-seated homosexual tendencies". They now require dioceses faced with an allegation to alert the authorities, conduct an investigation and remove the accused from duty. In 2008, the church asserted that the scandal was a very serious problem and estimated that it was "probably caused by 'no more than 1 per cent'", or 5,000, of the over 500,000 Catholic priests worldwide.

In April 2002, John Paul II, despite being frail from Parkinson's disease, summoned all the American cardinals to the Vatican to discuss possible solutions to the issue of sexual abuse in the American Church. He asked them to "diligently investigate accusations". John Paul II suggested that American bishops be more open and transparent in dealing with such scandals and emphasised the role of seminary training to prevent sexual deviance among future priests. In what The New York Times called "unusually direct language", John Paul condemned the arrogance of priests that led to the scandals:

"Priests and candidates for the priesthood often live at a level both materially and educationally superior to that of their families and the members of their own age group. It is therefore very easy for them to succumb to the temptation of thinking of themselves as better than others. When this happens, the ideal of priestly service and self-giving dedication can fade, leaving the priest dissatisfied and disheartened."

The pope read a statement intended for the American cardinals, calling the sex abuse "an appalling sin" and said the priesthood had no room for such men.

In 2002, Archbishop Juliusz Paetz, the Catholic Archbishop of Poznań, was accused of molesting seminarians. John Paul II accepted his resignation, and placed sanctions on him, prohibiting Paetz from exercising his ministry as bishop. It was reported that these restrictions were lifted, though Vatican spokesperson Federico Lombardi strenuously denied this saying "his rehabilitation was without foundation".

In 2003, John Paul II reiterated that "there is no place in the priesthood and religious life for those who would harm the young." In April 2003, a three-day conference was held, titled "Abuse of Children and Young People by Catholic Priests and Religious", where eight non-Catholic psychiatric experts were invited to speak to near all Vatican dicasteries' representatives. The panel of experts overwhelmingly opposed implementation of policies of "zero-tolerance" such as was proposed by the US Conference of Catholic Bishops. One expert called such policies a "case of overkill" since they do not permit flexibility to allow for differences among individual cases.

In 2004, John Paul II recalled Bernard Francis Law to be Archpriest of the Papal Basilica of Saint Mary Major in Rome. Law had previously resigned as archbishop of Boston in 2002 in response to the Catholic Church sexual abuse cases after church documents were revealed that suggested he had covered up sexual abuse committed by priests in his archdiocese. Law resigned from this position in November 2011.

John Paul II was a firm supporter of the Legion of Christ, and in 1998 discontinued investigations into sexual misconduct by its leader Marcial Maciel, who in 2005 resigned his leadership and was later requested by the Vatican to withdraw from his ministry. However, Maciel's trial began in 2004 during the pontificate of John Paul II, but the Pope died before it ended and the conclusions were known. In an interview with L'Osservatore Romano, Pope Francis said: "I am grateful to Pope Benedict, who dared to say this publicly (when more facts began to come to light after Degollado’s death in 2008, Pope Benedict XVI in 2010 launched another investigation and on 1 May 2010 announced a declaration about the crimes of the founder of the Legionaries), and to Pope John Paul II, who dared to give the green light to the Legionaries’ case."

On 10 November 2020, the Vatican published a report which found that John Paul II learned of allegations of sexual impropriety against former cardinal Theodore McCarrick, who at the time was serving as Archbishop of Newark, through a 1999 letter from Cardinal John O'Connor warning him that appointing McCarrick to be Archbishop of Washington D.C., a position which had recently been opened, would be a mistake. John Paul II ordered an investigation, which stalled when three of the four bishops tasked with investigating claims allegedly brought back "inaccurate or incomplete information." John Paul II planned on not giving McCarrick the appointment anyway, but relented and gave him the appointment after McCarrick wrote a letter of denial. He created McCarrick a cardinal in 2001. McCarrick would eventually be laicized after allegations surfaced that he abused minors. George Weigel, a biographer of John Paul II, defended the pope's actions as follows: "Theodore McCarrick fooled a lot of people ... and he deceived John Paul II in a way that is laid out in almost biblical fashion in [the Vatican's] report."

In a 2019 interview with Mexican television, Pope Francis defended John Paul II's legacy on protecting minors against clerical sexual abuse. He said that John Paul II was "often misled", as in the case of Hans Hermann Groër. Francis said that with respect to the case of Marcial Maciel:

"Ratzinger was courageous, and so was John Paul II. ... With respect to John Paul II, we have to understand certain attitudes because he came from a closed world, from behind the Iron Curtain, where communism was still in force. There was a defensive mentality. We have to understand this well, and no one can doubt the saintliness of this great man and his good will. He was great, he was great."On March 6, 2023, an investigative report by the Polish television station TVN24 concluded that "there [is now] no doubt" that John Paul II "knew about sexual abuse of children by priests under his authority and sought to conceal it when he was an archbishop in his native Poland." The Dutch journalist Ekke Overbeek released a book on John Paul II with similar claims the following week. In response to the claims, Pope Francis stated: "You have to put things in the context of the era[...] At that time everything was covered up. [...] It was only when the Boston scandal broke that the church began to look at the problem". The Polish Episcopal Conference stated that "'further archival research' would be needed to arrive at a just evaluation of the decisions and actions" of Wojtyła.

Other criticism and controversy 

John Paul II was widely criticised for a variety of his views. He was a target of criticism from progressives for his opposition to the ordination of women and use of contraception, and from traditional Catholics for his support for the Second Vatican Council and its reform of the liturgy. John Paul II's response to child sexual abuse within the Catholic Church has also come under heavy censure.

Opus Dei controversies 

John Paul II was criticised for his support of the Opus Dei prelature and the 2002 canonisation of its founder, Josemaría Escrivá, whom he called "the saint of ordinary life". Other movements and religious organisations of the church went decidedly under his wing Legion of Christ, the Neocatechumenal Way, Schoenstatt, the charismatic movement, etc. And he was accused repeatedly of taking a soft hand with them, especially in the case of Marcial Maciel, founder of the Legion of Christ.

In 1984 John Paul II appointed Joaquín Navarro-Valls, a member of Opus Dei, as Director of the Vatican Press Office. An Opus Dei spokesman said that "the influence of Opus Dei in the Vatican has been exaggerated". Of the nearly 200 cardinals in the Catholic Church, only two are known to be members of Opus Dei.

Banco Ambrosiano scandal 

John Paul II was alleged to have links with Banco Ambrosiano, an Italian bank that collapsed in 1982. At the centre of the bank's failure was its chairman, Roberto Calvi, and his membership in the illegal Masonic Lodge Propaganda Due (aka P2). The Vatican Bank was Banco Ambrosiano's main shareholder, and the death of John Paul I in 1978 is rumoured to be linked to the Ambrosiano scandal.

Calvi, often referred to as "God's Banker", was also involved with the Vatican Bank, Istituto per le Opere di Religione, and was close to Bishop Paul Marcinkus, the bank's chairman. Ambrosiano also provided funds for political parties in Italy, and for both the Somoza dictatorship in Nicaragua and its Sandinista opposition. It has been widely alleged that the Vatican Bank provided money for Solidarity in Poland.

Calvi used his complex network of overseas banks and companies to move money out of Italy, to inflate share prices, and to arrange massive unsecured loans. In 1978, the Bank of Italy produced a report on Ambrosiano that predicted future disaster. On 5 June 1982, two weeks before the collapse of Banco Ambrosiano, Calvi had written a letter of warning to John Paul II, stating that such a forthcoming event would "provoke a catastrophe of unimaginable proportions in which the Church will suffer the gravest damage". On 18 June 1982 Calvi's body was found hanging from scaffolding beneath Blackfriars Bridge in the financial district of London. Calvi's clothing was stuffed with bricks, and contained cash valued at US$14,000, in three different currencies.

Problems with traditionalists 
In addition to all the criticism from those demanding modernisation, some traditionalist Catholics denounced him as well. These issues included demanding a return to the Tridentine Mass, as well as the repudiation of reforms instituted after the Second Vatican Council, such as the use of the vernacular language in the formerly Latin Roman Rite Mass, ecumenism, and the principle of religious liberty. In 1988, the controversial traditionalist Archbishop Marcel Lefebvre, founder of the Society of St. Pius X (1970), was excommunicated under John Paul II because of the unapproved ordination of four bishops, which Cardinal Ratzinger called a "schismatic act".

The World Day of Prayer for Peace, with a meeting in Assisi, Italy, in 1986, in which the pope prayed only with the Christians, was criticised for giving the impression that syncretism and indifferentism were openly embraced by the Papal Magisterium. When a second Day of Prayer for Peace in the World was held in 2002, it was condemned as confusing the laity and compromising to false religions. Likewise criticised was his kissing of the Qur'an in Damascus, Syria, on one of his travels on 6 May 2001. His call for religious freedom was not always supported; bishops like Antônio de Castro Mayer promoted religious tolerance but at the same time rejected the Vatican II principle of religious liberty as being liberalist and already condemned by Pope Pius IX in his Syllabus errorum (1864) and at the First Vatican Council.

Religion and AIDS 

John Paul II continued the tradition of advocating for the culture of life. In solidarity with Pope Paul VI's Humanae vitae, he rejected artificial birth control, even in the use of condoms to prevent the spread of AIDS. Critics have said that large families are caused by lack of contraception and exacerbate Third World poverty and problems, such as street children in South America. John Paul II argued that the proper way to prevent the spread of AIDS was not condoms but rather "correct practice of sexuality, which presupposes chastity and fidelity." The focus of John Paul II's point is that the need for artificial birth control is itself artificial, and that principle of respecting the sacredness of life ought not be rent asunder in order to achieve the good of preventing AIDS.

Social programmes 
There was strong criticism of the pope for the controversy surrounding the alleged use of charitable social programmes as a means of converting people in the Third World to Catholicism. The pope created an uproar in the Indian subcontinent when he suggested that a great harvest of faith would be witnessed on the subcontinent in the third Christian millennium.

Dictatorships in Latin America 
John Paul II visited General Augusto Pinochet, Chile's military ruler. According to the United Press International, "Pope John Paul II preached the need for peaceful change and greater participation up and down Chile ... but stayed away from direct confrontation with Gen. Augusto Pinochet's military regime ... disappointing Pinochet's opponents who had hoped the pope would publicly condemn the regime and bless their campaign for a return to democracy."

John Paul II endorsed Cardinal Pio Laghi, who critics say supported the Dirty War in Argentina and was on friendly terms with the Argentine generals of the military dictatorship, playing regular tennis matches with the Navy's representative in the junta, Admiral Emilio Eduardo Massera.

Ian Paisley 
In 1988, when John Paul II was delivering a speech to the European Parliament, Ian Paisley, the leader of the Democratic Unionist Party and Moderator of the General Assembly of the Free Presbyterian Church of Ulster, shouted "I denounce you as the Antichrist!" He held up a red banner reading "Pope John Paul II ANTICHRIST". Otto von Habsburg (the last Crown Prince of Austria-Hungary), an Member of the European Parliament (MEP) for Germany, snatched Paisley's banner, tore it up, and along with other MEPs helped eject him from the chamber. The pope continued with his address after Paisley had been ejected.

Međugorje apparitions 

A number of quotes about the apparitions of Međugorje, in Bosnia and Herzegovina, have been attributed to John Paul II. In 1998, when a certain German gathered various statements that were supposedly made by the pope and Cardinal Ratzinger, and then forwarded them to the Vatican in the form of a memorandum, Ratzinger responded in writing on 22 July 1998: "The only thing I can say regarding statements on Međugorje ascribed to the Holy Father and myself is that they are [frei erfunden] complete invention." Similar claims were also rebuked by the Vatican's Secretariate of State.

Beatification controversy 
Some Catholic theologians disagreed with the call for the beatification of John Paul II. Eleven dissident theologians, including Jesuit professor José María Castillo and Italian theologian Giovanni Franzoni, said that his stance against contraception and the ordination of women as well as the church scandals during his pontificate presented "facts which according to their consciences and convictions should be an obstacle to beatification". Some traditionalist Catholics opposed his beatification and canonisation for his views on liturgy and participation in prayer with enemies of the church, heretics and non-Christians.

After the 2020 report about the handling of the sexual misconduct complaints against Theodore McCarrick, some called for John Paul II's sainthood to be revoked.

Personal life 

Wojtyła was a Cracovia football team supporter, and the club retired number 1 in his honour.
Having played the game himself as a goalkeeper, John Paul II was a fan of English football team Liverpool, where his compatriot Jerzy Dudek played in the same position.

In 1973, while still the archbishop of Kraków, Wojtyła befriended a Polish-born, later American philosopher, Anna-Teresa Tymieniecka. The thirty-two-year friendship (and occasional academic collaboration) lasted until his death. She served as his host when he visited New England in 1976, and photos show them together on skiing and camping trips. Letters that he wrote to her were part of a collection of documents sold by Tymieniecka's estate in 2008 to the National Library of Poland. According to the BBC the library had initially kept the letters from public view, partly because of John Paul's path to sainthood, but a library official announced in February 2016 the letters would be made public. In February 2016, the BBC documentary program Panorama reported that John Paul II had apparently had a close relationship with the Polish-born philosopher. The pair exchanged personal letters over 30 years, and Stourton believes that Tymieniecka had confessed her love for Wojtyła. The Vatican described the documentary as "more smoke than fire", and Tymieniecka denied being involved with John Paul II.

Writers Carl Bernstein, the veteran investigative journalist of the Watergate scandal, and Vatican expert Marco Politi, were the first journalists to talk to Anna-Teresa Tymieniecka in the 1990s about her importance in John Paul's life. They interviewed her and dedicated 20 pages to her in their 1996 book His Holiness. Bernstein and Politi even asked her if she had ever developed any romantic relationship with John Paul II, "however one-sided it might have been." She responded, "No, I never fell in love with the cardinal. How could I fall in love with a middle-aged clergyman? Besides, I'm a married woman."

See also 

 Beatifications by Pope John Paul II
 Cardinals created by John Paul II
 Compendium of the Social Doctrine of the Church
 List of longest-reigning popes
 List of peace activists
 List of places named after Pope John Paul II
 List of popes
 List of pastoral visits of Pope John Paul II
 Museum of John Paul II and Primate Wyszynski
 Papal travel
 Pope John Paul II bibliography
 Jerzy Kluger
 Attempted assassination of Pope John Paul II

People
 Peter Le Jacq
 Bolesław Taborski
Stanisław Dziwisz

References

Notes

Citations

Sources

Bibliography

Further reading 
 For a comprehensive list of books written by and about Pope John Paul II, please see Pope John Paul II bibliography
 For other references see Pope John Paul II in popular culture

External links 
 John Paul the Great Catholic University
 The Holy See website – John Paul II
 Papal Transition 2005 Web Archive from the US Library of Congress
 Karol Wojtyła on Culture.pl
 Third pilgrimage of John Paul II to Poland, Institute of National Remembrance
 Tomb of John Paul II in St Peter's
 Text of the Apostolic Constitution Fidei Depositum 
 Text of Laetamur magnopere, on the promulgation of the editio typica of the Catechism of the Catholic Church.
 
 Audio recordings with Pope John Paul II in the Online Archive of the Österreichische Mediathek Retrieved 27. March 2021
 Liturgical texts for the optional Memorial of St. John Paul II, Pope: Celebration of the Eucharist (English, Latin); Liturgy of the Hours (English, Latin) from The Holy See website.

 
1920 births
2005 deaths
20th-century Polish cardinals
20th-century Polish dramatists and playwrights
20th-century Polish male writers
20th-century Polish philosophers
20th-century popes
20th-century venerated Christians
21st-century popes
Anti-apartheid activists
Polish anti-poverty advocates
Anti-war activists
Archbishops of Kraków
Beatifications by Pope Benedict XVI
Burials at St. Peter's Basilica
Canonizations by Pope Francis
Cardinals created by Pope Paul VI
Catholic Church and ecumenism
Catholic Mariology
Catholic philosophers

Christian continental philosophers and theologians
Congressional Gold Medal recipients
Deaths from sepsis
Deaths from circulatory collapse
Divine Mercy
Infectious disease deaths in Vatican City
Jagiellonian University alumni
Academic staff of Jagiellonian University
John Paul II Catholic University of Lublin alumni
Academic staff of the John Paul II Catholic University of Lublin
Nonviolence advocates
Papal saints
Participants in the Second Vatican Council
People from Wadowice County
People in interfaith dialogue
People of the Cold War
Phenomenologists
Polish anti-communists
Polish anti-fascists
Polish beatified people
Polish democracy activists
Polish Esperantists
Polish human rights activists
Polish male dramatists and playwrights
Polish people of World War II
Polish poets
Polish popes
Polish Roman Catholic saints
Polish Roman Catholic theologians
Pontifical University of Saint Thomas Aquinas alumni
Popes
Presidential Medal of Freedom recipients
Recipients of the Order of the White Eagle (Poland)
Shooting survivors
Sustainability advocates
Time Person of the Year
Venerated Catholics by Pope Benedict XVI
Polish Roman Catholic archbishops